Kathleen Freeman (February 17, 1923August 23, 2001) was an American actress. In a career that spanned more than 50 years, she portrayed acerbic maids, secretaries, teachers, busybodies, nurses, and battle-axe neighbors and relatives, almost invariably to comic effect. In film, she is perhaps best remembered for appearing in 11 Jerry Lewis comedies in the 1950s and 1960s, The Blues Brothers (1980) and its sequel, and Naked Gun : The Final Insult (1994).

Early life
Freeman was born on February 17, 1923, in Chicago, Illinois. She began her career as a child, dancing in her parents' vaudeville act. Freeman was a Democrat who supported Adlai Stevenson during the 1952 presidential election. She was also a  practitioner of Religious Science International

Career

Film 
Freeman made her film debut in Wild Harvest (1947). For a short time in the early 1950s, Freeman was a Metro-Goldwyn-Mayer contract player, appearing mostly in small and uncredited bit parts. Her most notable early role was an uncredited part in the 1952 MGM musical Singin' in the Rain as Jean Hagen's diction coach Phoebe Dinsmore.

Beginning with the 1954 film 3 Ring Circus, Freeman became a favorite foil of Jerry Lewis, playing opposite him in 11 films. These included most of Lewis's better-known comedies, including The Disorderly Orderly as Nurse Higgins, The Errand Boy as the studio boss's wife, and The Nutty Professor as Millie Lemon. Over 30 years later, she made a brief appearance in Nutty Professor II: The Klumps.

Her other film roles included appearances in The Missouri Traveler (1958), the horror film The Fly (1958), the Western spoofs Support Your Local Sheriff! (1969) and Support Your Local Gunfighter (1971), and appearances in a spate of comedies in the 1980s and 1990s. Freeman played Sister Mary Stigmata (referred to as the Penguin) in John Landis' The Blues Brothers (1980) and Blues Brothers 2000, as a foul-mouthed apartment building manager in Dragnet, and a gangster mother in Naked Gun : The Final Insult. She also had cameos in Joe Dante's Innerspace and Gremlins 2: The New Batch (as tipsy cooking host Microwave Marge).

In the 1973 film The Sting, Freeman was seen in a family photo for Kid Twist’s character (played by Harold Gould) in the Western Union office scene.

Television 
In addition to teaching acting classes in Los Angeles, Freeman was a familiar presence on television. In 1958–59, she appeared three times on Buckskin, a children's program set in a hotel in a fictitious Montana town. She appeared from the 1950s until her death in regular or recurring roles on many sitcoms, including six episodes of The Bob Cummings Show (as Bertha Krause), Topper (as Katie the maid), and The Donna Reed Show (as Mrs. Celia Wilgus, the Stones' busybody next door neighbor). In 1964, she appeared in five episodes of The Lucy Show. Later, she was cast on Hogan's Heroes as Frau Gertrude Linkmeyer, General Burkhalter's sister, who longed to wed Colonel Klink. In 1973, she had a co-starring role with Dom DeLuise in the sitcom Lotsa Luck (based on the British sitcom On the Buses).

She appeared in several episodes of Wagon Train, Funny Face (as Mrs. Kate Harwell), I Dream of Jeannie (as a grouchy supervisor in a fantasy preview of Major Nelson's future, and later as a hillbilly), the short-lived prehistoric sitcom It's About Time (as Mrs. Boss), and as the voice of Peg Bundy's mom, an unseen character on Married... with Children. She played a female arm wrestler on Mama's Family. She appeared as a nurse in the television series Love American Style.

Freeman played Sgt Carter's mother in a 1969 episode of Gomer Pyle, U.S.M.C., as well as appearing as a different character in a 1968 episode of the same series. She also starred with Phil Silvers in The Beverly Hillbillies in episodes 25 and 26 of season eight and episodes two and three in season nine. She also made a first season appearance playing the wife of a couple who take the Clampetts to court, falsely accusing them of reckless driving and causing injuries to the couple (Season 1, Episode 32).

She remained active in her last two years with a regular voice role on As Told by Ginger, a voice bit in the animated feature film Shrek, and a guest appearance on the sitcom Becker. She received a Tony Award nomination and a Theatre World Award for her role as Jeannette Burmeister in the musical version of The Full Monty. In her final episode of As Told by Ginger, season two's "No Hope for Courtney", Freeman's character retires from her teaching job, although Carl and Hoodsey try convincing her to return to work. The script originally was written to have Mrs. Gordon return to Lucky Elementary School, but Freeman died before the episode was finished. The script was then rewritten, and Mrs. Gordon died, as well. The episode was dedicated in Freeman's memory. The dedication came at the end of the episode after the announcement that Elaine Gordon had died and Carl was crying. The screen faded to black and a title card said "In Memory of Kathleen Freeman".

Death
Weakened by illness, Freeman was forced to leave the Full Monty cast. Five days later, she died of lung cancer at age 78 at Lenox Hill Hospital. She was cremated and her ashes interred in a niche at Hollywood Forever Cemetery. She never married and she had no children. British reports of her death mentioned her long-time companion Helen Ramsey, but American obituaries did not.

Filmography

Film

Television

Video games

References

External links
 
 
 Kathleen Freeman Remembered, lucyfan.com; accessed December 14, 2014.
 Interview with Kathleen Freeman, TonyAwards.com; accessed December 14, 2014.

1923 births
2001 deaths
20th-century American actresses
21st-century American actresses
Actresses from Chicago
American film actresses
American musical theatre actresses
American stage actresses
American television actresses
American voice actresses
Burials at Hollywood Forever Cemetery
Deaths from lung cancer in New York (state)
American LGBT actors
LGBT people from Illinois
Theatre World Award winners
UCLA School of the Arts and Architecture alumni
Vaudeville performers
20th-century American singers
20th-century American women singers
Illinois Democrats
California Democrats
New York (state) Democrats
20th-century American LGBT people
21st-century American LGBT people
Religious Science